Eado may refer to:

 Changan Eado, a 2012–present Chinese compact car
 Changan Eado DT, a 2018–present Chinese subcompact sedan
 East Downtown Houston (abbreviated as EaDo), a district in Houston, Texas, United States
 EaDo/Stadium station, a METRORail station in Houston, Texas, United States